Meishar is a moshav  in south-central Israel. Located in the coastal plain near Gedera, it falls under the jurisdiction of Gederot Regional Council.

History
The moshav was founded in 1950, by immigrants from Poland and Germany, on land that had belonged to the depopulated Palestinian village of Bashshit.

References

German-Jewish culture in Israel
Moshavim
Polish-Jewish culture in Israel
Populated places in Central District (Israel)
Populated places established in 1950
1950 establishments in Israel
Agricultural Union